Nicholas Beverley Joicey  (born 11 May 1970) is Director General of the Cabinet Office's Economic and Domestic Secretariat, having previously been Director General for Finance at the Department for Work and Pensions, and before that, Director General for Strategy, International and Finance at the Department for Environment, Food and Rural Affairs. He previously worked as private secretary and speech writer to United Kingdom Chancellor Gordon Brown, as a journalist at The Observer newspaper and as director of the International Department at HM Treasury.

Early life
Joicey was born in Guisborough, to Harold Beverley and Wendy Joicey. He was educated at Wintringham School, Grimsby He studied for a degree in history at the University of Bristol and then completed a PhD at Peterhouse, Cambridge.

Career
From 1995 to 1996, Joicey worked at The Observer newspaper. He then moved to the Treasury, working as Private Secretary and Speech writer to Chancellor of the Exchequer, Gordon Brown between 1999 and 2001. Joicey was part of a United Kingdom delegation to the International Monetary Fund and World Bank in Washington from 2001 to 2003, heading the EU policy team from 2004 to 2006. He was Director for International Finance at HM Treasury, before joining the Department for Environment, Food and Rural Affairs in January 2014 as Director General for Strategy, International and Biosecurity. Joicey was appointed Department for Work and Pensions Finance Director General in July 2018. He serves as Director General of the Cabinet Office's Economic and Domestic Secretariat.

Joicey was appointed Companion of the Order of the Bath (CB) in the 2019 Birthday Honours for services to the environment.

Personal life
Joicey is married to Leeds West MP and Shadow Chancellor of the Exchequer Rachel Reeves. His interests include modern history and film and he is a trustee of the Cambridge Film Trust.

References

1970 births
Living people
Alumni of Peterhouse, Cambridge
Alumni of the University of Bristol
People from Guisborough
The Observer people
Companions of the Order of the Bath
Spouses of British politicians